"Sure Love" is a single by Australian singer-songwriter Jarryd James. It was released on August 4, 2015  and is the fourth single taken from James' debut studio album, Thirty One.

The track was produced by Malay who's previously worked with Frank Ocean. Outside of Australia the song was promoted alongside the Jarryd James (EP).

Reviews
Aliyah Allen of Notion Magazine said:""Sure Love" is a beautiful track in its entirety; consisting of a smooth, mellow beat and accompanied with soul-infused, RnB vocals, it makes for laid back listening. With similar sounds to James Blake and Louis Mattrs, Jarryd’s range is one to be reckoned with."

Pip Ellwood-Hughes of Entertainment Focus said ""Sure Love" is a dreamy track that showcases Jarryd’s impressive vocal range and firmly establishes who he is as an artist".

Digital Spy said "The song is a silky R&B number with jangly percussion that flickers like a wind chime. It's all very nice."

Chuck Campbell of knoxnews (n a review of the Jarryd James EP) said, "he emerges with a sense of measured optimism on “Sure Love,” puncturing through layers of overdubbed vocals to land squarely at the center of the hazy, hypnotic ambience."

Track listing
 "Sure Love" – 3:41

Release history

References

2015 singles
2015 songs
Jarryd James songs